Joachim Lubomirski (died 1610) was a Polish nobleman (szlachcic).

Joachim was a courtier in the royal court. He was the starost of Lipnice, Dobczyce and Tymbark. He never married. He died during the war with Muscovy in 1610.

Lubomiski, Joachim
Lubomiski, Joachim
Joachim Lubomirski
Polish courtiers